Dola may refer to:

 Dola (mythology), protective spirits in Polish mythology
 Dola, Ohio, United States
 Dola, Shahdol, India
 Dola, Gabon, a department of Gabon
 Dola, Burkina Faso
 DOLA, the Department of Land Administration

See also
Dola Hill Stadium, Zambia